Songmaker is an album of Christian music by Pat Boone, released in 1981 on his Lamb & Lion Records label.

Track listing

References 

1981 albums
Pat Boone albums
Dot Records albums